Jackie Sherrard (born 9 June 1966) is a former English former international football midfielder. She represented the England women's national football team at senior international level and spent most of her career at  Doncaster Belles.

References

1966 births
Living people
English women's footballers
Doncaster Rovers Belles L.F.C. players
England women's international footballers
Women's association football midfielders